Luigi Caponaro (Salerno, 14 August 1567 – Gaeta, 1622) was a healer in Naples and Gaeta, Italy in the late 16th and early 17th centuries.  Caponaro received a medical degree in Naples but never practiced medicine per se due to a reported aversion to the sight of blood.  Instead he roamed the streets of Naples and later Gaeta dispensing pro-bono medical advice and assistance to those in need.

Caponaro died in Gaeta at the age of 55 of cholera.

He is mentioned in the works of Giambattista Basile and Giulio Cesare Cortese.

1567 births
1622 deaths